Yarlagadda Lakshmi Prasad is an Indian writer and politician. He is the Chairman of the A.P. Hindi Academy; Professor in Hindi at Andhra University, Visakhapatnam, India, and is a former Rajya Sabha Member. He received the fourth highest Indian civilian honour of the Padma Shri in 2003, followed by the Sahitya Akademi Award in 2010. The Government of India honoured him again in 2016 with the Padma Bhushan, the third highest Indian civilian award.

Literary works
 Attadugu nundi Agrasthanam varaku
 Doctor Karan Singh (biography)
 Draupadi
 Harivamsrai Bachhan (biography)
 Kathanala Venuka Kathalu
 Mana Governor Narayanadutt Tiwari
 Puchalapalli Sundarayya (biography)
 Satyabhama (novel)
 Pakisthan lo Padi Rojulu

Awards
 Padma Shri - 2003
 Sahitya Akademi Award - 2010
 Ganga Sharan Singh Award - 2012
 Padma Bhushan - 2016

References

Rajya Sabha members from Andhra Pradesh
Recipients of the Sahitya Akademi Award in Telugu
Recipients of the Padma Shri in literature & education
1953 births
Living people
People from Krishna district
Hindi-language writers
Telugu-language writers
Writers from Andhra Pradesh
Academic staff of Andhra University
Recipients of the Padma Bhushan in literature & education
Recipients of the Sahitya Akademi Prize for Translation
Hindi–Telugu translators